John Glover Roberts Jr. (born January 27, 1955) is an American lawyer and jurist who has served as the 17th chief justice of the United States since 2005.  He has been described as having a conservative judicial philosophy but, above all, being an institutionalist. He has shown a willingness to work with the Supreme Court's liberal bloc, and, after the retirement of Anthony Kennedy in 2018, he has been regarded as the primary swing vote on the Court. However, Roberts is no longer regarded as the Court's median vote following the replacement of Ruth Bader Ginsburg by Amy Coney Barrett in 2020; Brett Kavanaugh is now considered to have this role.

Roberts has authored the majority opinion in many landmark cases, including decisions relating to elections (Shelby County, Rucho, Citizens United), federal agencies (West Virginia v. EPA, Seila Law v. CFPB, PCAOB), presidential power (Trump v. Hawaii, Mazars, Vance, Medellín v. Texas), the Affordable Care Act (NFIB v. Sebelius, King v. Burwell), religion (Hosanna-Tabor, Trinity Lutheran, Espinoza), and digital searches (Carpenter, Riley v. California).

Roberts grew up in northwestern Indiana and was educated in a series of Catholic schools. He studied history at Harvard University and then attended Harvard Law School, where he was managing editor of the Harvard Law Review. He served as a law clerk for Circuit Judge Henry Friendly and then-associate justice William Rehnquist before taking a position in the attorney general's office during the Reagan Administration. He went on to serve the Reagan Administration and the George H. W. Bush Administration in the Department of Justice and the Office of the White House Counsel, during which he was nominated by George H. W. Bush to the U.S. Court of Appeals for the District of Columbia Circuit, but no vote on his nomination was held. Roberts then spent 14 years in private law practice. During this time, he argued 39 cases before the Supreme Court. Notably, he represented 19 states in United States v. Microsoft Corp. 

Roberts became a federal judge in 2003, when President George W. Bush appointed him to the District of Columbia Circuit. During his two-year tenure on the D.C. Circuit, Roberts authored 49 opinions, eliciting two dissents from other judges, and authoring three dissents of his own. In 2005, Bush nominated Roberts to the Supreme Court, initially to be an associate justice to fill the vacancy left by the retirement of Justice Sandra Day O'Connor. Chief Justice William Rehnquist died shortly afterward, however, before Roberts's Senate confirmation hearings had begun. Bush then withdrew Roberts's nomination and instead nominated him to become Chief Justice, choosing Samuel Alito to replace O'Connor.

Early life and education 
John Glover Roberts Jr. was born on January 27, 1955, in Buffalo, New York, the son of Rosemary (née Podrasky; 1929–2019) and John Glover "Jack" Roberts Sr. (1928–2008). His father had Irish and Welsh ancestry, and his mother was a descendant of Slovak immigrants from Szepes, Hungary. He has an elder sister, Kathy, and two younger sisters: Peggy and Barbara. Roberts spent his early childhood years in Hamburg, New York, where his father worked as an electrical engineer for the Bethlehem Steel Corporation at its large factory in Lackawanna.

In 1965, ten-year-old Roberts and his family moved to Long Beach, Indiana, where his father became manager of a new steel plant in nearby Burns Harbor. Roberts attended La Lumiere School, a small but affluent and academically rigorous Catholic boarding school in La Porte, Indiana, where he was captain of the school's football team and was a regional champion in wrestling. He also participated in choir and drama, and co-edited the school newspaper. He graduated first in his class in 1973.

Roberts then studied history at Harvard University, entering with sophomore (second-year) standing based on his high school academic achievements. One of his first papers, "Marxism and Bolshevism: Theory and Practice", won Harvard's William Scott Ferguson Prize for most outstanding essay by a sophomore history major, and in his senior year his paper "The Utopian Conservative: A Study of Continuity and Change in the Thought of Daniel Webster" won a Bowdoin Prize. He lived in Straus Hall and Leverett House, and each summer he returned home to earn money working at the steel plant his father managed. He graduated in 1976 with an A.B., summa cum laude, and was elected to Phi Beta Kappa. 

Roberts had originally planned to pursue a Ph.D. in history and become a professor but decided instead to attend Harvard Law School. He became managing editor of the Harvard Law Review and graduated in 1979 with a J.D., magna cum laude.

Early legal career 

After graduating from law school, Roberts was a law clerk for Judge Henry Friendly of the U.S. Court of Appeals for the Second Circuit from 1979 to 1980, then for Justice (later Chief Justice in 1986) William Rehnquist of the U.S. Supreme Court from 1980 to 1981. 

Following his clerkships, Roberts began working for the U.S. government in the Administration of President Ronald Reagan, first from 1981 to 1982 as a special assistant to U.S. Attorney General William French Smith, then from 1982 to 1986 as an associate with the White House Counsel. He then entered private practice in Washington, D.C., as an associate at the law firm Hogan & Hartson (now Hogan Lovells) and worked in the field of corporate law.

In 1989, Roberts joined the Administration of president George H. W. Bush as Principal Deputy Solicitor General. He served as the acting solicitor general for the case of Metro Broadcasting, Inc. v. FCC when the solicitor general, Ken Starr, had a conflict of interest. In the case, Roberts argued against policies of the FCC intended to increase minority ownership of broadcast licenses, arguing that the racial preferences were unconstitutional. Roberts's decision to argue that a federal agency's policy was unconstitutional surprised many lawyers within the Solicitor General's office. In 1992, Bush nominated Roberts to a seat on the U.S. Court of Appeals for the D.C. Circuit, but no Senate vote was held, and Roberts's nomination expired at the end of the 102nd Congress.

Following Bush's defeat by Bill Clinton in the 1992 presidential election, Roberts left government service and returned to Hogan & Hartson as a partner. He became the head of the firm's appellate practice, and also became an adjunct professor at the Georgetown University Law Center. During this time, Roberts argued 39 cases before the Supreme Court, prevailing in 25 of them. He represented 19 states in United States v. Microsoft. Those cases include:

During this time he worked pro bono for gay rights advocates, reviewing filings and preparing arguments for the 1996 Supreme Court case Romer v. Evans, which was described in 2005 as "the movement's most important legal victory". Roberts's involvement with the case was minimal, as he later stated that he had been involved for less than ten hours in preparing oral arguments. He also argued on behalf of the homeless, in a case which became one of Roberts's "few appellate losses." He also represented, pro bono, a man who was sentenced to death for killing eight people in Florida.

During the late 1990s, while working for Hogan & Hartson, Roberts served as a member of the steering committee of the Washington, D.C., chapter of the conservative Federalist Society. In 2000, Roberts advised Jeb Bush, then governor of Florida, concerning Bush's actions in the Florida election recount during the presidential election.

U.S. Court of Appeals for the District of Columbia Circuit 

On May 9, 2001, President George W. Bush nominated Roberts to a seat on the U.S. Court of Appeals for the District of Columbia Circuit to replace judge James L. Buckley, who had recently retired. However, the Democratic Party had a majority in the Senate at the time and was in conflict with Bush over his judicial nominees. Senate Judiciary Committee chairman Patrick Leahy refused to give Roberts a hearing in the 107th Congress. The GOP regained control of the Senate on January 7, 2003, and Bush resubmitted Roberts's nomination that day. Roberts was confirmed on May 8, 2003, and received his commission on June 2, 2003. During his two-year tenure on the D.C. Circuit, Roberts authored 49 opinions, eliciting two dissents from other judges, and authoring three dissents of his own.

Fourth and Fifth amendments 

Hedgepeth v. Washington Metropolitan Area Transit Authority, 386 F.3d 1148, involved a 12-year-old girl who was arrested, searched, handcuffed, and fingerprinted after she violated a publicly advertised zero tolerance "no eating" policy in a Washington Metro station by eating a single french fry. She was released to her mother three hours later. She sued, alleging that an adult would have only received a citation for the same offense, while children must be detained until parents are notified. The D.C. Circuit unanimously affirmed the district court's dismissal of the girl's lawsuit, which was predicated on alleged violations of the Fourth Amendment (unreasonable search and seizure) and Fifth Amendment (equal protection).

"No one is very happy about the events that led to this litigation," Roberts wrote. Because age discrimination is evaluated using a rational basis test, however, only weak state interests were required to justify the policy, and the panel concluded they were present. "Because parents and guardians play an essential role in that rehabilitative process, it is reasonable for the District to seek to ensure their participation, and the method chosen—detention until the parent is notified and retrieves the child—certainly does that, in a way issuing a citation might not." The court concluded that the policy and detention were constitutional, noting that "the question before us ... is not whether these policies were a bad idea, but whether they violated the Fourth and Fifth amendments to the Constitution," language reminiscent of Justice Potter Stewart's dissent in Griswold v. Connecticut. "We are not asked in this case to say whether we think this law is unwise, or even asinine," Stewart had written; "[w]e are asked to hold that it violates the United States Constitution. And that, I cannot do."

Military tribunals 
In Hamdan v. Rumsfeld, Roberts was part of a unanimous circuit panel overturning the district court ruling and upholding military tribunals set up by the Bush Administration for trying terrorism suspects known as enemy combatants. Circuit Judge A. Raymond Randolph, writing for the court, ruled that Salim Ahmed Hamdan, a driver for al-Qaeda leader Osama bin Laden, could be tried by a military court because:

 the military commission had the approval of the United States Congress;
 the Third Geneva Convention is a treaty between nations and as such it does not confer individual rights and remedies enforceable in U.S. courts;
 even if the convention could be enforced in U.S. courts, it would not be of assistance to Hamdan at the time because, for a conflict such as the war against Al-Qaeda (considered by the court as a separate war from that against Afghanistan itself) that is not between two countries, it guarantees only a certain standard of judicial procedure without speaking to the jurisdiction in which the prisoner must be tried.

The court held open the possibility of judicial review of the results of the military commission after the current proceedings ended. This decision was overturned on June 29, 2006, by the Supreme Court in a 5–3 decision, with Roberts not participating due to his prior participation in the case as a circuit judge.

Environmental regulation 
Roberts wrote a dissent in Rancho Viejo, LLC v. Norton, 323 F.3d 1062, a case involving the protection of a rare California toad under the Endangered Species Act. When the court denied a rehearing en banc, 334 F.3d 1158 (D.C. Cir. 2003), Roberts dissented, arguing that the panel opinion was inconsistent with United States v. Lopez and United States v. Morrison in that it incorrectly focused on whether the regulation substantially affects interstate commerce rather than on whether the regulated activity does. In Roberts's view, the Commerce Clause of the Constitution did not permit the government to regulate activity affecting what he called "a hapless toad" that "for reasons of its own, lives its entire life in California." He said that reviewing the panel decision would allow the court "alternative grounds for sustaining application of the Act that may be more consistent with Supreme Court precedent."

Appointment to Supreme Court 

On July 19, 2005, President Bush nominated Roberts to the U.S. Supreme Court to fill a vacancy to be created by the impending retirement of justice Sandra Day O'Connor. Roberts's nomination was the first Supreme Court nomination since Stephen Breyer in 1994.

On September 3, 2005, while Roberts's confirmation was pending before the Senate, Chief Justice William H. Rehnquist died. Two days later, Bush withdrew Roberts's nomination as O'Connor's successor and announced Roberts's new nomination as Chief Justice.

Roberts's testimony on his jurisprudence 
During his confirmation hearings, Roberts said that he did not have a comprehensive jurisprudential philosophy, and he did "not think beginning with an all-encompassing approach to constitutional interpretation is the best way to faithfully construe the document." Roberts compared judges to baseball umpires: "[I]t's my job to call balls and strikes, and not to pitch or bat." Among the issues he discussed during the hearings were:

Commerce Clause 
In Senate hearings, Roberts has stated:

Federalism 
Roberts stated the following about federalism in a 1999 radio interview:

Reviewing Acts of Congress 
At a Senate hearing, Roberts stated:

Stare decisis 
On the subject of stare decisis, referring to Brown v. Board of Education, the decision overturning school segregation, Roberts said that "the Court in that case, of course, overruled a prior decision. I don't think that constitutes judicial activism because obviously if the decision is wrong, it should be overruled. That's not activism. That's applying the law correctly."

Roe v. Wade 
While working as a lawyer for the Reagan Administration, Roberts wrote legal memos defending administration policies on abortion. At his nomination hearing Roberts testified that the legal memos represented the views of the administration he was representing at the time and not necessarily his own. "Senator, I was a staff lawyer; I didn't have a position," Roberts said. As a lawyer in the George H. W. Bush Administration, Roberts signed a legal brief urging the court to overturn Roe v. Wade.

In private meetings with senators before his confirmation, Roberts testified that Roe was settled law, but added that it was subject to the legal principle of stare decisis, meaning that while the Court must give some weight to the precedent, it was not legally bound to uphold it.

In his Senate testimony, Roberts said that, while sitting on the Appellate Court, he had an obligation to respect precedents established by the Supreme Court, including the right to an abortion. He stated: "Roe v. Wade is the settled law of the land. ... There is nothing in my personal views that would prevent me from fully and faithfully applying that precedent, as well as Casey." Following the traditional reluctance of nominees to indicate which way they might vote on an issue likely to come before the Supreme Court, he did not explicitly say whether he would vote to overturn either. However, Jeffrey Rosen adds, "I wouldn't bet on Chief Justice Roberts's siding unequivocally with the anti-Roe forces."

Confirmation 
On September 22, the Senate Judiciary Committee approved Roberts's nomination by a vote of 13–5, with Senators Ted Kennedy, Richard Durbin, Charles Schumer, Joe Biden and Dianne Feinstein voting against. Roberts was confirmed by the full Senate on September 29 by a margin of 78–22. All Republicans and the one Independent voted for Roberts; the Democrats split evenly, 22–22. Roberts was confirmed by what was, historically, a narrow margin for a Supreme Court justice. However, all subsequent confirmation votes have been even more narrow.

U.S. Supreme Court 

Roberts took the Constitutional oath of office, administered by Associate Justice John Paul Stevens at the White House, on September 29, 2005. On October 3, he took the judicial oath provided for by the Judiciary Act of 1789 at the United States Supreme Court building.

Justice Antonin Scalia said that Roberts "pretty much run[s] the show the same way" as Rehnquist, albeit "let[ting] people go on a little longer at conference ... but [he'll] get over that." Roberts has been portrayed as a consistent advocate for conservative principles by analysts such as Jeffrey Toobin. Garrett Epps has described Roberts's prose as "crystalline, vivid, and often humorous".

Seventh Circuit judge Diane Sykes, surveying Roberts's first term on the Court, concluded that his jurisprudence "appears to be strongly rooted in the discipline of traditional legal method, evincing a fidelity to text, structure, history, and the constitutional hierarchy. He exhibits the restraint that flows from the careful application of established decisional rules and the practice of reasoning from the case law. He appears to place great stock in the process-oriented tools and doctrinal rules that guard against the aggregation of judicial power and keep judicial discretion in check: jurisdictional limits, structural federalism, textualism, and the procedural rules that govern the scope of judicial review." Roberts has been said to operate under an approach of judicial minimalism in his decisions, having stated, "[i]f it is not necessary to decide more to a case, then in my view it is necessary not to decide more to a case." His decision making and leadership demonstrates an intent to preserve the Court's power and legitimacy while dually maintaining judicial independence. Roberts was ranked 50th in the 2016 Forbes ranking of "The World's Most Powerful People."

In November 2018, the Associated Press approached Roberts for comment after President Donald Trump described a jurist who ruled against his asylum policy as an "Obama judge". In response, Roberts asserted that "[w]e do not have Obama judges or Trump judges, Bush judges or Clinton judges. What we have is an extraordinary group of dedicated judges doing their level best to do equal right to those appearing before them." His remarks were widely interpreted as a rebuke of President Trump's comments. As Chief Justice, Roberts presided over the first impeachment trial of Donald Trump, which began on January 16 and ended on February 5, 2020. Roberts did not, however, preside over Trump's second impeachment trial, believing that the Constitution only requires that the chief justice preside in the trial of the sitting president and not of a former president.

Although Roberts is identified as having a conservative judicial philosophy, Roberts is seen as having a more moderate conservative orientation, particularly when Bush v. Gore is compared to Roberts's vote for the ACA: his vote in National Federation of Independent Business v. Sebelius to uphold the Patient Protection and Affordable Care Act (ACA) caused the press to contrast his Court with the Rehnquist Court. Roberts's judicial philosophy is seen as more moderate and conciliatory than Antonin Scalia's and Clarence Thomas's. He wishes more consensus from the Court. Roberts's voting pattern is most closely aligned to Samuel Alito's.

After the confirmation of Amy Coney Barrett, several commentators wrote that Roberts was no longer the leading justice. As the five other conservative justices could outvote the rest, he supposedly could no longer preside over a moderately conservative course while respecting precedent. This view was espoused again after the 2022 Dobbs decision, which overturned rulings from 1973 and 1992.

Early decisions 
On January 17, 2006, Roberts dissented along with Antonin Scalia and Clarence Thomas in Gonzales v. Oregon, which held that the Controlled Substances Act does not allow the United States attorney general to prohibit physicians from prescribing drugs for the assisted suicide of the terminally ill as permitted by an Oregon law. The point of contention in the case was largely one of statutory interpretation, not federalism.

On March 6, 2006, Roberts wrote the unanimous decision in Rumsfeld v. Forum for Academic and Institutional Rights that colleges accepting federal money must allow military recruiters on campus, despite university objections to the Clinton Administration-initiated "don't ask, don't tell" policy.

Campaign finance 
Following his concurrence in Citizens United v. FEC (2010), Roberts wrote the majority decision for another landmark campaign finance case called McCutcheon v. FEC (2014). In McCutcheon the Court ruled that "aggregate limits" on the combined amount a donor could give to various federal candidates or party committees violated the First Amendment.

Fourth Amendment
Roberts wrote his first dissent in Georgia v. Randolph (2006). The majority's decision prohibited police from searching a home if both occupants are present but one objected and the other consented. Roberts criticized the majority opinion as inconsistent with prior case law and for partly basing its reasoning on its perception of social custom. He said the social expectation test was flawed because the Fourth Amendment protects a legitimate expectation of privacy, not social expectations.

In Utah v. Strieff (2016), Roberts joined the majority in ruling (5–3) that a person with an outstanding warrant may be arrested and searched, and that any evidence discovered based on that search is admissible in court; the majority opinion held that this remains true even when police act unlawfully by stopping a person without reasonable suspicion, before learning of the existence of the outstanding warrant.

In Carpenter v. United States, a landmark decision involving privacy of cellular phone data, Roberts wrote the majority opinion in a 5–4 ruling that searches of cellular phone data generally require a warrant.

Notice and opportunity to be heard 
Although Roberts has often sided with Scalia and Thomas, he also provided a crucial vote against their mutual position in Jones v. Flowers, siding with liberal justices of the court in ruling that, before a home is seized and sold in a tax-forfeiture sale, due diligence must be demonstrated and proper notification needs to be sent to the owners. Dissenting justices were Anthony Kennedy, Antonin Scalia and Clarence Thomas, while Roberts's opinion was joined by David Souter, Stephen Breyer, John Paul Stevens and Ruth Bader Ginsburg. Samuel Alito did not participate.

Abortion 
In Gonzales v. Carhart (2007), Roberts voted with the majority to uphold the constitutionality of the Partial-Birth Abortion Ban Act. Justice Anthony Kennedy, writing for a five-justice majority, distinguished Stenberg v. Carhart, and concluded that the Court's previous decision in Planned Parenthood v. Casey did not prevent Congress from banning the procedure. The decision left the door open for future as-applied challenges, and did not address the broader question of whether Congress had the authority to pass the law. Justice Clarence Thomas filed a concurring opinion, contending that the Court's prior decisions in Roe v. Wade and Casey should be reversed; Roberts declined to join that opinion.

In 2018, Roberts and Brett Kavanaugh joined four more liberal justices in declining to hear a case brought by the states of Louisiana and Kansas to deny Medicaid funding to Planned Parenthood, thereby letting stand lower court rulings in favor of Planned Parenthood. Roberts also joined with liberal justices in 5–4 decisions temporarily blocking a Louisiana abortion restriction (2019) and later striking down that law (June Medical Services, LLC v. Russo (2020)). The law at issue in June was similar to one the court struck down in Whole Woman's Health v. Hellerstedt (2016), which Roberts had voted to uphold; in his June opinion, Roberts wrote that while he believed Whole Woman's Health was wrongly decided he was joining the majority in June out of respect for stare decisis. It was the first time in his 15 years on the Supreme Court that Roberts had cast a vote to invalidate a law that regulated abortion. In September 2021, the Supreme Court declined an emergency petition to temporarily block enforcement of the Texas Heartbeat Act, which bans abortion after six weeks of pregnancy except to save the mother's life. In a 5–4 vote, Roberts joined Breyer, Sotomayor, and Kagan in the minority.
In 2022, Roberts declined to join the majority opinion in Dobbs v. Jackson Women's Health Organization, which overturned Roe v. Wade. Roberts wrote a concurring opinion supporting only the decision to uphold the Mississippi abortion statute, stating that the right to an abortion should "extend far enough to ensure a reasonable opportunity to choose, but need not extend any further". Roberts also declined to join the dissenting opinion of Justices Breyer, Sotomayor, and Kagan.

Capital punishment 
On November 4, 2016, Roberts was the deciding vote in a 5–3 decision to stay an execution. On February 7, 2019, Roberts was part of the majority in a 5–4 decision rejecting a Muslim inmate's request to delay execution in order to have an imam present with him during the execution. Also, in February 2019, Roberts sided with Justice Kavanaugh and the court's four liberal justices in a 6–3 decision to block the execution of a man with an "intellectual disability" in Texas.

Equal Protection Clause 
Roberts opposes the use of race in assigning students to particular schools, including for purposes such as maintaining integrated schools. He sees such plans as discrimination in violation of the Constitution's Equal Protection Clause and Brown v. Board of Education. In Parents Involved in Community Schools v. Seattle School District No. 1, the Court considered two voluntarily-adopted school district plans that relied on race to determine which schools certain children may attend. The Court had held in Brown that "racial discrimination in public education is unconstitutional," and later, that "racial classifications, imposed by whatever federal, state, or local governmental actor, ... are constitutional only if they are narrowly tailored measures that further compelling governmental interests," and that this "[n]arrow tailoring ... require[s] serious, good faith consideration of workable race-neutral alternatives." Roberts cited these cases in writing for the Parents Involved majority, concluding that the school districts had "failed to show that they considered methods other than explicit racial classifications to achieve their stated goals." In a section of the opinion joined by four other justices, Roberts added that "[t]he way to stop discrimination on the basis of race is to stop discriminating on the basis of race."

Free speech 
Roberts authored the 2007 student free speech case Morse v. Frederick, ruling that a student in a public school-sponsored activity does not have the right to advocate drug use on the basis that the right to free speech does not invariably prevent the exercise of school discipline.

On April 20, 2010, in United States v. Stevens, the Supreme Court struck down an animal cruelty law. Roberts, writing for an 8–1 majority, found that a federal statute criminalizing the commercial production, sale, or possession of depictions of cruelty to animals was an unconstitutional abridgment of the First Amendment right to freedom of speech. The Court held that the statute was substantially overbroad; for example, it could allow prosecutions for selling photos of out-of-season hunting.

Health care reform 
On June 28, 2012, Roberts delivered the majority opinion in National Federation of Independent Business v. Sebelius, which upheld the Patient Protection and Affordable Care Act by a 5–4 vote. The Court indicated that although the "individual mandate" component of the Act could not be upheld under the Commerce Clause, the mandate could be construed as a tax and was therefore ruled to be valid under Congress's authority to "lay and collect taxes." The Court overturned a portion of the law related to the withholding of funds from states that did not comply with the expansion of Medicaid; Roberts wrote that "Congress is not free ... to penalize states that choose not to participate in that new program by taking away their existing Medicaid funding."
Sources within the Supreme Court state that Roberts switched his vote regarding the individual mandate sometime after an initial vote and that Roberts largely wrote both the majority and minority opinions. This extremely unusual circumstance has also been used to explain why the minority opinion was also unsigned, itself a rare phenomenon from the Supreme Court.

LGBT rights 
In Hollingsworth v. Perry (2013), Roberts wrote the 5–4 majority opinion holding that Petitioners, appealing a lower court ruling that California's Proposition 8 was unconstitutional, lacked standing to sue, with the result that same-sex marriages resumed in California. Roberts dissented in United States v. Windsor in which the 5-4 majority ruled that key parts of the Defense of Marriage Act were unconstitutional. The case stated the federal government must recognize same-sex marriages that have been approved by certain states. He dissented in the Obergefell v. Hodges case in which Kennedy wrote for the majority, again 5–4, that same-sex couples had a right to marry. In Pavan v. Smith, the Supreme Court "summarily overruled" the Arkansas Supreme Court's decision that the state did not have to list same-sex spouses on birth certificates; Clarence Thomas, Samuel Alito, and Neil Gorsuch dissented, but Roberts did not join their dissent, leaving open speculation that he might have ruled with the majority. In the cases of Bostock v. Clayton County, Altitude Express, Inc. v. Zarda, and R.G. & G.R. Harris Funeral Homes Inc. v. Equal Employment Opportunity Commission (2020), heard together, Roberts ruled with the 6–3 majority deciding that businesses cannot discriminate against LGBT people in matters of employment. In October 2020, Roberts joined the justices in an "apparently unanimous" decision to reject an appeal from Kim Davis, who refused to provide marriage licenses to same-sex couples.

In Fulton v. City of Philadelphia (2021), Roberts joined the justices in a unanimous decision in favor of a Catholic adoption agency which had been denied a contract by the City of Philadelphia for its policy refusing to adopt to same-sex couples; he was also part of the majority that declined to reconsider or overturn Employment Division v. Smith, "an important precedent limiting First Amendment protections for religious practices." Also in 2021, he was one of the six justices who declined to hear an appeal by a Washington State florist who refused service to a same-sex couple based on her religious beliefs against same-sex marriage; because four votes are required to hear a case, the lower court judgments against the florist remain in place. In November 2021, Roberts voted with the majority of justices in a 6–3 decision to reject an appeal from Mercy San Juan Medical Center, a hospital affiliated with the Roman Catholic Church, which had sought to deny a hysterectomy to a transgender patient on religious grounds. Justices Thomas, Alito, and Gorsuch dissented; the vote to reject the appeal left in place a lower court ruling in favor of the transgender patient.

Voting Rights Act 

During his tenure as Chief Justice of the Supreme Court, Roberts has struck down voting rights protections provided by the Voting Rights Act. In Shelby County v. Holder (2013), Roberts struck down requirements that states and localities with a history of racially motivated voter suppression obtain federal preclearance before implementing any changes to voting laws. Research shows that preclearance had led to increases in minority congressional representation and minority turnout. Five years after the ruling, nearly 1,000 U.S. polling places had closed, many of them in predominantly African-American counties. There were also cuts to early voting, purges of voter rolls and imposition of strict voter ID laws. A 2020 study found that jurisdictions that had previously been covered by preclearance substantially increased their voter registration purges after the Shelby decision. Virtually all restrictions on voting subsequent to the ruling were enacted by Republicans.

Personal life 
Roberts and his wife, Jane Sullivan, were married on July 27, 1996. Sullivan is a lawyer who became a prominent legal recruiter at the firms of Major, Lindsey & Africa and Mlegal. Along with Clarence Thomas, she is on the board of trustees at her alma mater, the College of the Holy Cross. The couple lives in Chevy Chase, Maryland, an affluent suburb of Washington, D.C., and they have two adopted children: John "Jack" and Josephine "Josie".

Roberts is one of 15 Catholic justices—out of 115 justices total—in the history of the Supreme Court. Of those fifteen justices, six (Roberts, Clarence Thomas, Samuel Alito, Sonia Sotomayor, Brett Kavanaugh, and Amy Coney Barrett) are currently serving.

Health 
In 2007, Roberts had a seizure at his vacation home in St. George, Maine
and stayed overnight at a hospital in Rockport, Maine;
doctors found no identifiable cause.
Roberts had suffered a similar seizure in 1993
but an official Supreme Court statement said that a neurological evaluation "revealed no cause for concern." Federal judges are not required by law to release information about their health.

On June 21, 2020, Roberts fell at a Maryland country club; his forehead required sutures and he stayed overnight in the hospital for observation. Doctors ruled out a seizure and believed dehydration had made Roberts light-headed.

Finances 
According to a disclosure Roberts submitted to the Senate Judiciary Committee prior to his Supreme Court confirmation hearings, Roberts's net worth was more than $6 million, including $1.6 million in stocks. In joining the D.C. Circuit Court of Appeals in 2003, he took a pay cut from $1 million a year to $164,000; as Chief Justice his salary is $286,700 as of 2022.

In 2010, Roberts sold his stock in Pfizer because he was set to hear two pending cases involving the company.

Published works 
  Section III ("The Takings Clause") of the unsigned student note "Developments in the Law: Zoning" (pp. 1427–1708).
  Subsection C ("Contract Clause—Legislative Alteration of Private Pension Agreements: Allied Structural Steel Co. v. Spannaus") of Section I ("Constitutional Law") of the unsigned student note "The Supreme Court, 1977 Term" (pp. 1–339).

See also 
 Demographics of the Supreme Court of the United States
 List of justices of the Supreme Court of the United States
 List of law clerks of the Supreme Court of the United States (Chief Justice)
 List of law clerks of the Supreme Court of the United States (Seat 9)
 List of United States chief justices by time in office
 List of United States Supreme Court justices by time in office
 United States Supreme Court cases decided by the Roberts Court

References

Sources

Further reading

News articles
 
 Goodnough, Abby (July 21, 2005). "Nominee Gave Quiet Advice on Recount"  The New York Times.
 
 
 </ref>

Other

External links 

 
 
 
 Appearances at the U.S. Supreme Court from the Oyez Project
 Issue positions and quotes at OnTheIssues
 Judge Roberts's Published Opinions in a searchable database
 Chief Justice John Roberts at About.com
 List of Circuit Judge Roberts's opinions for the DC Circuit 
 A summary of media-related cases handled by Supreme Court nominee John G. Roberts Jr. from The Reporters Committee for Freedom of the Press, July 21, 2005
 SCOTUSblog
 List of Chief Justices, including John Roberts, Jr.
 On first day, Roberts sets no-nonsense tone – The Boston Globe

|-

|-

1955 births
20th-century American lawyers
21st-century American lawyers
21st-century American judges
American people of Czechoslovak descent
American people of Irish descent
American people of Welsh descent
Catholics from Indiana
Catholics from Maine
Chief justices of the United States
Federalist Society members
George H. W. Bush administration personnel
Georgetown University Law Center faculty
Harvard College alumni
Harvard Law School alumni
Judges of the United States Court of Appeals for the D.C. Circuit
Current Justices of the Supreme Court of the United States
La Lumiere School alumni
Law clerks of the Supreme Court of the United States
Lawyers from Buffalo, New York
Lawyers from Washington, D.C.
Lawyers who have represented the United States government
Living people
People associated with Hogan Lovells
People from LaPorte County, Indiana
People from St. George, Maine
Reagan administration personnel
United States court of appeals judges appointed by George W. Bush
United States Department of Justice lawyers
United States federal judges appointed by George W. Bush